Leon Lee (simplified Chinese: 李晨浩 pinyin: Li Chenhao) (born 18 October 1988) is a Chinese actor, director, and producer.

He appeared in Chinese movies including The Lost Tomb, The Conspirators, Streets of Fury, and Last Flight. In 2013, he starred as Mark in The Banman and was awarded the 2013 Best New Actor by the China Film Director Association.

Early life 
Leon Lee (pinyin: Li Chenhao) was born in Chongqing, China, on October 18, 1988. whose first name means “Ocean in the morning” in Chinese. Leon’s father is a geography teacher, and his mother is a physician. He has wanted to become an actor since he was age 8, inspired by his uncle who owned video rental store. Growing up, he was full of energy and somewhat troublesome, so his parents decided to introduce him to various hobbies such as martial arts, basketball, horse-riding, science club and painting to keep him out of trouble, which worked out very well he even skipped 6th grade and graduated with honors.
He quickly developed a love for acting at the age of 13 years when his English teacher encouraged him to start the English school play club. At the age of 15, Leon came in second place in local Amateur Comedy Contest.

Acting career 
Leon majored in English Literature in Chongqing Jiaotong University and he went to New York City to take acting and film-making courses as an exchange student, and later on he moved to Beijing to pursue his career in acting. In the meantime, he worked as an English teacher, model, emcee, and viral video producer. In that time, he landed himself a starring role on La Vita Mode (2012 Singapore, Malaysia), The Conspirators (2013 Hong Kong), and Last Flight (2014 China Thailand)

Filmography

Film

Television series

References 

Living people
Chinese male film actors
Chinese male television actors
Male actors from Chongqing
1988 births